The PUK insurgency was a low-level rebellion of the Patriotic Union of Kurdistan (PUK) against Baathist Iraq from 1975-1979, following the defeat of the Kurdistan Democratic Party (KDP) in the Second Iraqi–Kurdish War, which forced that organization to declare a ceasefire and move into exile in Iran. Due to lack of foreign support, the PUK guerrillas were only able to operate in the most remote parts of the mountains of Iraqi Kurdistan. During this period, the PUK plunged into a political crisis with the KDP, which led to heavy intra-Kurdish warfare, climaxing in 1977. After the insurgency, the PUK entered into an alliance with Iranian forces during the Iran–Iraq War, and were backed by Iran in the Kurdish rebellion of 1983.

Background

Autonomy in Iraqi Kurdistan was originally charted in 1970 as the Kurdish Autonomous Region following the agreement of an Autonomy Accord between the government of Iraq and leaders of the Iraqi Kurdish community. A Legislative Assembly was established in the city of Arbil with theoretical authority over the Kurdish-populated governorates of Erbil, Dahuk and As Sulaymaniyah. The autonomy plan however collapsed over a dispute over the oil rich town of Kirkuk, resulting in the 1974–1975 Second Iraqi–Kurdish War.

After the 1975 Algiers Agreement, when the KDP lost Iranian support, the KDP was defeated and forced to move into exile by March 1975, while the Iraqi military re-asserted control over all of Northern Iraq. As a result, the PUK was formed in July 1975 in Damascus, Syria, by a branch of former KDP operatives, led by Jalal Talabani.

Timeline

Beginning of the insurgency
PUK forces began engaging with Iraqi military in late 1975, right in the aftermath of the Second Iraqi–Kurdish War, and continued through 1976. Those raids by the PUK against Iraqi government were not favorably considered by Mustafa Barzani, the leader of the KDP.

Intra-Kurdish fighting
In the aftermath of the Second Iraqi–Kurdish War, KDP groups ambushed and killed PUK fighters on several occasions in 1976–1977. Minor intra-Kurdish clashes between the PUK and the KDP took place in July 1976, January 1977 and February 1977. Talabani vowed revenge, and at various moments ordered his troops to fire upon any KDP troops – but suffered from operational weaknesses compared to the KDP.

Upon Talabani's return to Iraq in 1977 from his exile in Damascus, he organized the PUK into peshmerga troops, setting his headquarters in Nawkan (Iranian Kurdistan) and Kandil (South Kurdistan). The first intense KDP–PUK fighting occurred in Baradust area in April 1978, when Ali Askari's force of 800 PUK fighters was attacked by KDP Peshmerge, led by Sami Abd al-Rahman. Askari's inferior force was overwhelmed by 7,500 KDP troops and some 700 were killed including the capture & execution of Askari himself. This defeat caused many PUK members to abandon it in search of a stronger and more effective leadership.

Feuding and splitting continued throughout the late 1970s, as the KDP, PUK, and KDP-I jostled for influence and funding from neighboring states.

Aftermath

The PUK and KDP jointly sided Iran in the Iran–Iraq War, which erupted in 1980. Through the warfare between Iran and Iraq Kurdish rebellion took place in north Iraq, initiated by both PUK and KDP. With backing of Iranian forces the rebels managed to gain control of several parts of Kurdsitan, however after the cease-fire between Iran and Iraq came into effect, the Kurdish rebels were crushed by the Al-Anfal campaign.

See also
 List of modern conflicts in the Middle East

Notes

1976 in Iraq
1977 in Iraq
1978 in Iraq
1979 in Iraq
Conflicts in 1976
Conflicts in 1977
Conflicts in 1978
Conflicts in 1979
Kurdish rebellions in Iraq